Ó Paí, Ó (colloquial form of "Olhe Para Isso, Olhe", translated as Look At This, Look) is a 2007 Brazilian drama film directed by Monique Gardenberg. It tells the story of cortiço residents in Pelourinho, the historical center of Salvador, Bahia on the last day of carnaval. Lacking money but not desire for amusement, they get by on creativity, irony, sensuality, and music.

The film inspired a TV series, also named Ó Paí, Ó, broadcast on Rede Globo. The 10-episode show premiered on October 31, 2008, and also stars Lázaro Ramos.

Cast
Lázaro Ramos as Roque
Wagner Moura as Boca
Dira Paes as Psilene
Stênio Garcia as Seu Jerônimo
Luciana Souza as Dona Joana
Érico Brás as Reginaldo
Tânia Tôko as Neusão da Rocha
Emanuelle Araújo as Rosa
Virginia Rodrigues as Bioncetão

References

External links
 

2000s musical comedy-drama films
2007 films
Brazilian musical comedy-drama films
Films shot in Salvador, Bahia
2000s Portuguese-language films
2007 comedy films
2007 drama films